Lakeside High School is located in Saybrook Township, near Ashtabula, Ohio, and is the only high school in the Ashtabula Area City School District.  Formed in 2001, it was a merger of the two high schools which had previously existed in the district, Harbor High School and Ashtabula High School. For its first few years of operation, ninth-grade students were taught in the old Harbor High School, while 10th-12th grade students attended the old Ashtabula High School. In 2006, a new building was opened. This new building is the first of a total of seven new campus style school buildings to be erected in the area.  The next to be built will be Lakeside Elementary School Campus School, which will be located a few miles away from the high school.

References

External links
 District Website

High schools in Ashtabula County, Ohio
Ashtabula, Ohio
Public high schools in Ohio
Public middle schools in Ohio
2001 establishments in Ohio